Teracotona homeyeri is a moth of the  family Erebidae. It is found in Angola, the Democratic Republic of Congo, Malawi and Tanzania.

References

Moths described in 1910
Spilosomina
Insects of Angola
Insects of Tanzania
Moths of Africa